County Route 581 (CR 581) is a county highway in the U.S. state of New Jersey. The highway extends  from Main Street (Route 49) in Quinton Township to Bridgeton Pike (Route 77) in Harrison Township.

Route description

CR 581 begins at an intersection with Route 49 in Quinton Township, Salem County, heading east-northeast on two-lane undivided Alloway Road. The road runs through areas of farms and woods along with homes. The setting becomes more rural as the road continues east and crosses into Alloway Township. Residential development increases as the road runs through the community of Alloway and crosses CR 540. The route intersects CR 611 before becoming Commissioners Pike and making a turn northeast at Alloway Lake and intersecting CR 603. CR 581 enters rural areas with some homes again at this point and crosses CR 672 before entering Pilesgrove Township. Within Pilesgrove Township, the road has intersections with CR 614 and CR 615.
 
Crossing into Upper Pittsgrove Township, the route reaches the US 40 intersection. Continuing more to the north-northeast, CR 581 has junctions with CR 619 and CR 660. Upon crossing Oldmans Creek, the road continues into South Harrison Township in Gloucester County and intersects CR 694 and CR 538. Residential development increases past the intersection with the latter as the route enters Harrison Township. CR 581 comes to its northern terminus at an intersection with Route 77 in the community of Mullica Hill.

History 
The Commissioners' Pike used to be known as the Commissioners' Road. Due to its renaming, the road was likely maintained by the Mullica Hill and Pole Tavern Turnpike Company, chartered in 1851 to maintain a road from Mullica Hill to Daretown.

Major intersections

See also

References

External links 

County Route 581

581
581
581